This is a list of diplomatic missions in Uruguay. There are currently 43 embassies in Montevideo. Several countries have non-resident embassies.

Diplomatic missions in Montevideo

Embassies

Other posts
 (Delegation)
 (Office of the embassy)

Gallery of embassies

Consular missions

Montevideo
 (Consulate General)

Artigas
 (Vice-Consulate)

Chuy
 (Consulate)

Colonia del Sacramento
 (Consulate)

Fray Bentos
 (Consulate)

Maldonado
 (Consulate)

Paysandú
 (Consulate)

Río Branco
 (Vice-Consulate)

Rivera
 (Consulate General)

Salto
 (Consulate)

Non-resident representation
Resident in Buenos Aires unless otherwise noted.

     (Brasilia)

     (Nassau)
     (Washington, D.C.)
     (Brasilia)
     

 (Brasilia)

     (Madrid)

     (Brasilia)

     (Brasilia)
     (Brasilia)

     (Washington, D.C.)

     (Brasilia)
     (Caracas)
     (Santiago de Chile)
     (Brasilia)

     (New York City)
     (Washington, D.C.)

     (Valletta)

     (Brasilia)

 (Brasilia)

     (New York City)
     (Brasilia)

     (Brasilia)

      

     (Brasilia)

     (Brasilia)

     

 (Brasilia)

Closed missions

See also
 Foreign relations of Uruguay
 List of diplomatic missions of Uruguay

References

Montevideo diplomatic list

List
Uruguay
Diplomatic missions